Carlos Eduardo da Silva Santos (born 12 March 2001), commonly known as Carlão, is a Brazilian footballer who plays as a central defender for Spanish club Almería B.

Club career

Náutico
Born in Recife, Pernambuco, Carlão started his career with the youth sides of hometown club Náutico. In February 2019, he moved to Fluminense on loan, being initially assigned to the under-20s.

Back to Náutico in July 2019, Carlão made his first team debut on 19 July 2020, starting in a 2–1 Campeonato Pernambucano away win over Salgueiro, and providing an assist to Thiago Fernandes' opening goal. On 12 March of the following year, he renewed his contract until the end of 2023.

On 24 March 2021, Carlão moved to Corinthians also on loan, and joined their under-20 squad. In June, however, his loan with Timão was cancelled, after the club and Náutico failed to reach an agreement for other players.

Upon returning to his parent club, Carlão was immediately assigned to the main squad, and featured regularly in the year's Série B.

Almería
On 5 October 2022, Carlão moved abroad for the first time in his career, and was announced at La Liga club UD Almería; he was initially assigned to the reserves in Tercera Federación.

Career statistics

Honours
Náutico
Campeonato Pernambucano: 2021, 2022

References

2001 births
Living people
Sportspeople from Recife
Brazilian footballers
Association football defenders
Campeonato Brasileiro Série B players
Clube Náutico Capibaribe players
Tercera Federación players
UD Almería B players
Brazilian expatriate footballers
Brazilian expatriate sportspeople in Spain
Expatriate footballers in Spain